Acicular may refer to 

 In botany: a slender leaf shape
 In mineralogy: Acicular (crystal habit) refers to a needle-like crystal form
 Acicular ferrite, a microstructure of ferrite in steel